In mathematics, a Hecke L-function may refer to:
 an L-function of a modular form
 an L-function of a Hecke character